Pramod Utwal is an Indian politician. He belongs to the Bharatiya Janata Party. He is a member of Seventeenth Legislative Assembly of Uttar Pradesh representing the Purqazi assembly constituency. He is 49 years old (2017) and a high-school dropout.

Political career
Pramod Utwal has been a member of the 17th Legislative Assembly of Uttar Pradesh. Since 2017, he has represented the Purqazi (Assembly constituency) and is a member of the Bhartiya Janata Party. He defeated Indian National Congress candidate Deepak Kumar by a margin of 11,253 votes.

Posts held

References 

Living people
Bharatiya Janata Party politicians from Uttar Pradesh
Uttar Pradesh MLAs 2017–2022
People from Muzaffarnagar
Year of birth missing (living people)